Phytobia is a genus of flies on the family Agromyzidae, with a worldwide distribution principally in Europe and the Americas.

Description 
As with many Agromyzidae, species of Phytobia are typically leaf miners on various plants, although other plant parts may be attacked.  For example, P. betulae lays its eggs on the bark of new-growth twigs of suitable birch trees and, after hatching, larvae tunnel downwards along the shoot within the differentiating xylem layer, sometimes reaching the base of the tree.  Adults are small-medium-sized flies (approximately 5 mm in the case of  P. betulae).

Species 
The Catalogue of Life lists: 

 Phytobia allecta
 Phytobia alocomentula
 Phytobia amelanchieris
 Phytobia aucupariae
 Phytobia betulae
 Phytobia betulivora
 Phytobia bifida
 Phytobia bifistula
 Phytobia bohemica
 Phytobia brincki
 Phytobia californica
 Phytobia calyptrata
 Phytobia cambii
 Phytobia carbonaria
 Phytobia cerasiferae
 Phytobia clypeolata
 Phytobia colorata
 Phytobia confessa
 Phytobia correntosana
 Phytobia coylesi
 Phytobia diversata
 Phytobia ecuadorensis
 Phytobia errans
 Phytobia fausta
 Phytobia flavohumeralis
 Phytobia flavosquamata
 Phytobia frutescens
 Phytobia furcata
 Phytobia fusca
 Phytobia gigas
 Phytobia grandissima
 Phytobia guatemalensis
 Phytobia harai
 Phytobia hirticula
 Phytobia incerta
 Phytobia indecora
 Phytobia insulana
 Phytobia inusitata
 Phytobia ipeii
 Phytobia iraeos
 Phytobia iridis
 Phytobia kallima
 Phytobia kuhlmanni
 Phytobia lanei
 Phytobia lateralis
 Phytobia liepae
 Phytobia lineata
 Phytobia longipes
 Phytobia lunulata
 Phytobia luzonensis
 Phytobia maai
 Phytobia macalpinei
 Phytobia magna
 Phytobia malabarensis
 Phytobia mallochi
 Phytobia manifesta
 Phytobia matura
 Phytobia mentula
 Phytobia millarae
 Phytobia monsonensis
 Phytobia morio
 Phytobia nigeriensis
 Phytobia nigrita
 Phytobia optabilis
 Phytobia pallida
 Phytobia pansa
 Phytobia peruensis
 Phytobia pipinna
 Phytobia powelli
 Phytobia prolata
 Phytobia propincua
 Phytobia pruinosa
 Phytobia pruni
 Phytobia prunivora
 Phytobia pseudobetulivora
 Phytobia rabelloi
 Phytobia ruandensis
 Phytobia sasakawai
 Phytobia semibifurcata
 Phytobia seticopia
 Phytobia setitibialis
 Phytobia setosa
 Phytobia shizukoae
 Phytobia spinulosa
 Phytobia subdiversata
 Phytobia terminalis
 Phytobia triplicis
 Phytobia unica
 Phytobia waltoni
 Phytobia vanduzeei
 Phytobia vilkamaai
 Phytobia vindhyaensis
 Phytobia xanthophora
 Phytobia yalomensis

References

External links
 
 

Agromyzidae
Brachycera genera